Kai-Ming Ho is a Senior Physicist at Ames Laboratory and distinguished Professor in Department of Physics and Astronomy at Iowa State University.

Honors 
 2012 Aneesur Rahman Prize for Computational Physics (American Physical Society)

External links 
 Personal website

21st-century American physicists
Iowa State University faculty
University of California, Berkeley alumni
Year of birth missing (living people)
Living people
Hong Kong physicists
Alumni of the University of Hong Kong
Computational physicists